Neil L. Kelleher is the Walter and Mary Elizabeth Glass Professor of Chemistry, Molecular Biosciences, and Medicine at Northwestern University. His research focuses on mass spectrometry, primarily its application to proteomics. He is known mainly for top-down proteomics and the development of the fragmentation technique of electron-capture dissociation with Roman Zubarev while in Fred McLafferty's lab at Cornell University.

Early life and education
 B.S. Pacific Lutheran University
 M.S. and Ph.D. Cornell University

Research interests
 Mass spectrometry
 Electron-capture dissociation
 Proteomics
 Top-down proteomics

Awards
 Biemann Medal, 2009
 Pittsburgh Conference Achievement Award, 2008
 Pfizer Award in Enzyme Chemistry (American Chemical Society, Division of Biological Chemistry), 2006
 A.F. Findeis Award in Measurement Science (American Chemical Society, Division of Analytical Chemistry), 2006
 Beckman Fellow, 2002-2003
 Presidential Early Career Award
 Alfred P. Sloan Fellow
 Packard Fellow
 NSF CAREER Award
 Lilly Analytical Chemistry Award
 Burroughs Wellcome Fund Young Investigator
 Searle Scholar
 Fulbright Scholar

References

External links
Kelleher Group Website

Pacific Lutheran University alumni
Cornell University alumni
Northwestern University faculty
21st-century American chemists
Mass spectrometrists
Living people
1970 births
Harvard University people